"Roll the Dice" is a song by English singer-songwriter Steve Harley, which was released in 1978 as the lead single from his debut solo album Hobo with a Grin. The song was written by Harley and Jo Partridge, and produced by Michael J. Jackson.

Background
Harley began working on his debut solo album, Hobo with a Grin, in 1977, after disbanding Cockney Rebel. While most of the album was recorded in London, "Roll the Dice" was one of two tracks to be recorded and mixed at Sunset Sound in Los Angeles. It was the only track on Hobo with a Grin not to be produced by Harley, but the album's assistant producer, Michael J. Jackson.

"Roll the Dice" was released in July 1978 as the first single from Hobo with a Grin, a week before the release of the album. Despite strong airplay, the song was not a commercial success and failed to make an appearance in the UK Top 75. The song was included on BBC Radio 1's "Featured 40", Radio Luxembourg's "Top 40", Capital's "B List", Piccadilly's "Hit 30", Downtown's "Featured 50" and Beacon's "B List". It also received play on BRMB and Hallam FM, BBC Radio Tees, Trent FM, Radio Victory, Swansea Sound and Plymouth Gold. The song peaked at No. 18 on the Radio & Record News Top 30 Airplay chart for the week ending 11 August 1978.

"Roll the Dice" was released in the United States in August 1978. At the time, The Denver Post reported how Harley disdained the song's commercial potential in the United States. Harley commented, "It's 'poppy', with that Fleetwood Mac-ish shuffle. 'Catchy' is not a good thing in this country. The more AM radio I hear, the more convinced I am that the goal is to bore."

Release
"Roll the Dice" was released on 7-inch vinyl by EMI Records in the UK, Germany, Spain, Australia and New Zealand, and by Capitol Records in North America. For its release as a single, an edited version of the song was made, which shortened the song by approximately half a minute. The B-side, "Waiting", was written and produced by Harley. The track was exclusive to the single and has not appeared on any other release since. In the UK, Germany and Spain, the single was released with colour picture sleeves. In the UK, the first 20,000 copies of the single featured the sleeve.

Following its original release as a single, and on Hobo with a Grin, the song has since appeared on various Steve Harley compilations, including 1981's Collection, 1992's Make Me Smile: The Best of Steve Harley, 1996's Premium Gold Collection 1998's More Than Somewhat – The Very Best of Steve Harley, 1999's The Cream of Steve Harley & Cockney Rebel, and 2006's The Cockney Rebel – A Steve Harley Anthology.

Promotion
A music video was filmed to promote the single. It was filmed over a two-day period in the Bakersfield Desert, California. Shot on 35mm film, videos were also produced at the same time for "I Wish It Would Rain" and "Amerika the Brave", both from Hobo with a Grin. The single was promoted by a full-page, black-and-white advert in the 22 July 1978 issue of New Musical Express.

Critical reception
On its release, Philip Hall of Record Mirror considered "Roll the Dice" to be "strongly Americanised" and "very smooth, very polished", with Harley's vocal being "less distinctive than usual". He added, "It's got a hook line which I can't stop singing, and which you should give a listen to." Harry Doherty of Melody Maker was critical of the song, describing it as "poor" and noting the "singing drifts aimlessly into middle age". He added, "Whatever pop sensibilities Harley once possessed, they have finally deserted him".

In the United States, music trade magazine Billboard listed the song under their "Top Single Picks" section in August 1978, under the heading "Recommended Pop". Record World praised the song as "highly-polished power pop, with a strong melody, well performed by guitars and keyboards". Cash Box listed the single as one "to watch". They commented on Partridge's "strong guitar work", Harley's "good singing" and felt the song was "suited to Top 40 lists".

In a review of Hobo with a Grin, G. Brown of The Denver Post commented, "If Harley is due for a hit single, 'Roll the Dice' could fill the bill nicely. Led by a catchy keyboard introduction, the song boasts a great hook and a youthful Harley vocal." In a review of the 2008 compilation The Best of Steve Harley, Dave Thompson of AllMusic commented that the song "deserve[s] a fresh hearing."

Track listing
7-inch single
"Roll the Dice" – 3:12
"Waiting" – 2:52

7-inch single (US promo)
"Roll the Dice" (Stereo) – 3:12
"Roll the Dice" (Mono) – 3:12

Personnel
Roll the Dice
 Steve Harley – vocals
 Michael McDonald, Bill Champlin, Rosemary Butler, Bobby Kimball, Tom Kelley – backing vocals
 Bill Payne – acoustic piano
 Duncan Mackay – electric piano, harpsichord, synthesizer
 Jo Partridge – electric guitars
 Fred Tackett – acoustic guitar
 Bob Glaub – bass
 Rick Shlosser – drums
 Michael J. Jackson – percussion

Production
 Michael J. Jackson – producer, additional production, mixing
 John Haeny – engineer
 James Isaacson – engineer, remixing, additional recording
 Paul Black – assistant engineer
 Ken Perry – mastering
 Steve Harley – producer of "Waiting"

References

1978 songs
1978 singles
Steve Harley songs
Songs written by Steve Harley
EMI Records singles
Capitol Records singles